Tevrin Brandon (born 1990) is a former American football cornerback in the Canadian Football League (CFL) and National Football League (NFL). He signed in 2015. He played college football at Connecticut before transferring to Monmouth and was signed by the Kansas City Chiefs as an undrafted free agent in 2014.

Early life
Brandon attended Bethlehem Catholic High School in Bethlehem, Pennsylvania, where he played varsity football and track. Brandon was a state medalist in the 100-meter dash in both his junior and senior years, and was named All-Conference and All-State in the 100-meter dash. In his senior year, Brandon was a part of Bethlehem Catholic's state championship 4x100 meter relay team.

References

External links
Monmouth Hawks bio

1990 births
Living people
American football cornerbacks
Bethlehem Catholic High School alumni
Brooklyn Bolts players
Denver Broncos players
Monmouth Hawks football players
Sportspeople from Bethlehem, Pennsylvania
UConn Huskies football players